Adam bin Nor Azlin (born 5 January 1996) is a Malaysian professional footballer who plays for Johor Darul Ta'zim and the Malaysia national team. Adam plays mainly as a forward and a winger while playing with his club but has instead given another role as a defender while playing for the Malaysia U-23.

Adam was handpicked as a 16-year-old by former Harimau Muda coach Ong Kim Swee towards the end of 2012. He remained part of Ong's squad for the European stint in 2013 and the National Premier Leagues Queensland in 2014 before joining Harimau Muda B in the S.League in 2015. He represented Malaysia U-23 in the 2015 Bangabandhu Cup, 2015 Southeast Asian Games and 2017 Southeast Asian Games

Club career

Selangor FA
Following the disbanding of Harimau Muda project in late 2015, Adam signs for Selangor FA for two seasons.

Johor Darul Ta'zim
On 18 November 2017, Johor Darul Ta'zim announced the signing of Adam from Selangor FA.

International career
On 13 November 2017, Adam made his debut for Malaysia national team as a starter in a 1–4 defeat to North Korea of the 2019 AFC Asian Cup qualification that was held in New I-Mobile Stadium.

Personal life
In 2018, he married Nur Azlin Md Mazlan.

Career statistics

Club

International

International goals

U-23

Senior
Scores and results list Malaysia's goal tally first.

Honours

Club
Johor Darul Takzim F.C.
Malaysia Cup: 2019 , 2022
Malaysia Super League: 2018,2019, 2020, 2021
Malaysia Charity Shield: 2019, 2020, 2022

International

Malaysia U-23
Bangabandhu Cup: 2015
Southeast Asian Games  Silver Medal: 2017

Individual
 Malaysia Football League Most Promising Player: 2017

References

External links
 
 

1996 births
Living people
Malaysian footballers
People from Selangor
Selangor FA players
Malaysia Super League players
Malaysia international footballers
Association football utility players
Southeast Asian Games silver medalists for Malaysia
Southeast Asian Games medalists in football
Footballers at the 2018 Asian Games
Association football defenders
Association football midfielders
Association football forwards
Competitors at the 2017 Southeast Asian Games
Asian Games competitors for Malaysia
Competitors at the 2019 Southeast Asian Games
Malaysia youth international footballers